Kovalam is a region in the city of Trivandrum, around 13 km southwest of the city center, whose beaches are a tourist destination.

Etymology
Kovalam means "coconut grove," after the coconut trees which are common there.

History
Kovalam first received attention when the Regent Maharani Sethu Lakshmi Bayi of Travancore constructed her beach resort, Halcyon Castle, here towards the end of the 1920s. Thereafter the place was brought to the public eye by her nephew the Maharaja of Travancore. The European guests of the then Travancore kingdom discovered the potentiality of Kovalam beach as a tourist destination in the 1930s. In the early 1970s many hippies came on their way to Ceylon in the Hippie Trail, beginning the transformation of a casual fishing village of Kerala into a significant tourist destination.

Geography

Beaches
Kovalam has three beaches separated by rocky outcroppings in its 17 km coastline, the three together form the crescent of the Kovalam beach.

 Lighthouse Beach - the southernmost beach, the Lighthouse Beach, is named after the 118 feet (36 m) Vizhinjam Lighthouse located on top of the Kurumkal hillock. 

 Hawah Beach - also known as Eve's Beach, consists of a high rock promontory and a bay, and is used by local fishermen.

 Samudra Beach - separated from the Lighthouse Beach by a large promontory, it is also used by local fishermen.

 Ashoka Beach - sea-wall to see the sea above the rocks and swimmable shallow waters

Places to visit 
 Karamana River - Karamana River originates from the southern part of Sahyadri Range. The river predominantly flows through an outskirt region of Kovalam called Karmana, hence the nomenclature.
 Vellayani Lake 
 Halcyon Castle
 Kovalam Art Gallery
 Valiyathura Pier
 Neyyar Dam
 Aruvikkara Dam
 Thiruvallam Parasurama Temple
 Vizhinjam Rock Cut Cave Temple

Tourist facilities
There are a large number of beach resorts in and around Kovalam. The sea port of Vizhinjam is about 3 km away and famous for its special varieties of fish, old Hindu temples, churches and a mosque. The Proposed International Trans shipment Terminal at Vizhinjam is also close to Kovalam.

Kovalam was among the most prominent tourist spots in India during the hippy era. It still has a high status among tourists, who arrive mostly from Europe and Israel. Kovalam is finding a new significance in the light of several Ayurvedic salons, and recuperation and regeneration resorts which provide a wide variety of Ayurvedic treatments for tourists.

One of the first hotels to open there was the Kovalam Beach Resort, which was designed by Charles Correa from 1969–74.

Transport

Politics
Kovalam assembly constituency is part of Trivandrum (Lok Sabha constituency). In 2016 Kerala Assembly elections, M Vincent of the Indian National Congress defeated incumbent Jameela Prakasham by over 2,500 votes.

Gallery

See also 
A few other beaches in Kerala
 Kollam Beach
 Varkala Beach
Shankumugham Beach

References

External links
 

Beaches of Kerala
Tourist attractions in Thiruvananthapuram
Villages in Thiruvananthapuram district
Populated coastal places in India